Eupomatia laurina, commonly named bolwarra, native guava or copper laurel, is a species of plant in the primitive flowering-plant family Eupomatiaceae, endemic to Australia and New Guinea. In Australia, it is found in humid forests of the east coast, from as far south as Nowa Nowa in Victoria, north through New South Wales and Queensland to tropical Cape York Peninsula. It usually grows as an understorey plant in rainforests or humid Eucalypt forests.

The branches bear globose to urn-shaped fruits which are green in colour and measure  in diameter. They yellow when ripe and contain pale-coloured, edible, jelly-like flesh inside, with many non-edible seeds (similar appearance to guava contents). Germination from fresh seed commences after around three weeks and completes after five weeks, with a high rate of germination. Flowers are pollinated by small weevils, including Elleschodes hamiltoni and others in the same genus. Cuttings are not advised as a method of regeneration.

The sweet, aromatic fruit is used as a spice-fruit in cooking and in beverages, jams and desserts. It is best used in combination with other ingredients that complement its strong flavour, and hence should be considered one of the Australian spices.

In cultivation E. laurina is frost sensitive and prefers a protected, semi-shaded site. It can be propagated from seed or cuttings. Cutting propagated trees produce fruit after two years. Seedlings take four to six years to fruit.

References

 Cherikoff, Vic, The Bushfood Handbook, .
 Low, Tim, Wild Food Plants of Australia, 

Bushfood
Magnoliales
Flora of New Guinea
Magnoliids of Australia
Flora of Queensland
Flora of New South Wales
Flora of Victoria (Australia)
Fruits originating in Asia
Trees of Australia